This is an alphabetical list of songs written or co–written by the American songwriter Dennis Linde.

"Song" – artist (co–writers)

A
"A Letter To You" – Shakin' Stevens, Eddy Raven
"All Fall Down" – Roger Miller
"Another Golden Oldie Night for Wendy" – England Dan & John Ford Coley

B
"Bad Love" – Tom Jones
"Belinda" – Roy Orbison
"The Big Revival" – John Anderson, Montgomery Gentry, Kenny Chesney
"Bondeblå" – Hellbillies (Arne Moslatten)
"Bone Dry" – George Jones (Don Devaney)
"A Blue Guitar" – Tanya Tucker
"Bubba Shot the Jukebox" – Mark Chesnutt
"Burning Love" – Arthur Alexander, Elvis Presley, Travis Tritt, Wynonna Judd

C
"Call Me Honey" – Arthur Alexander
"Call Me in Tahiti" – Arthur Alexander
"Call Me John Doe" – Joe Diffie
"Callin' Baton Rouge" – New Grass Revival, The Oak Ridge Boys, Garth Brooks, Billie Jo Spears
"Can I Make You Feel It" – The Crickets
"Can't Wait" – Roy Orbison (Alan Rush)
"Cast Iron Heart" – Pearl River, Linda Davis, Blackhawk
"Christmas Eve Can Kill You" – The Everly Brothers
"Colonel Maggie" – Roger Miller
"Cool Me in the River of Love" – Michael Johnson, Six Shooter
"Cool Rider" – Grease 2
"Come On Rain" – The Oak Ridge Boys
"Crystal Day" – Roger Miller

D
"Deep in Louisiana" – The Oak Ridge Boys
"Dr. Rock N. Roll" – Sawyer Brown
"Down and Dirty" – Johnny Lee
"Down in a Ditch" – Joe Diffie
"Down into Muddy Water" – Brother Phelps, Shelly Fairchild, Aaron Neville
"Down to the Station" – B. W. Stevenson

F
"Five Gallon Tear" – Aaron Tippin

G
"Goodbye Earl" – the Chicks
"Goodbye Marie" – Bobby Goldsboro, Kenny Rogers, Mel McDaniel

H
"Had a Dream (For the Heart)" – Elvis Presley, The Judds, Teresa Brewer
"Heaven Bound (I'm Ready)" – The Oak Ridge Boys, Shenandoah
"Hello, I Am Your Heart" – Manfred Mann's Earth Band, Nitty Gritty Dirt Band
"Hold On, Elroy" – Dude Mowrey
"Holdin' On to You" – The Oak Ridge Boys
"Hook, Line and Sinker" – Blackhawk

I
"I Don't Really Want You" – Travis Wammack (1972), Roy Orbison (1977)
"I Don't Want Nobody ('Ceptin' You) – Toni Brown and Terry Garthwaite
"I Got a Feelin' in My Body" – Elvis Presley
"I Got It for You" – Billy Swan
"I'm Comin' Home" – Arthur Alexander
"I'm Gonna Get You" – Eddy Raven
"I'm Tired of Singing My Song in Las Vegas" – The Everly Brothers
"In a Letter to You" – Shakin' Stevens, Eddy Raven
"It Sure Is Monday" – Mark Chesnutt

J
"Janie Baker's Love Slave" – Shenandoah
"John Deere Green" – Joe Diffie
"Junior's in Love" – Joe Diffie

K
"Kick It" - The Bo-Keys
"Kitty Star" - The Good Brothers, Ron Nigrini

L
"Lola's Love" – Ricky Van Shelton, Lee Greenwood, Sawyer Brown
"Long Long Texas Road" – Roy Drusky
"Lookout Mountain" – Brother Phelps
"Love Is Everywhere" – The Oak Ridge Boys, Mel McDaniel
"Love Rustler" – Delbert McClinton, Foghat
"The Love She Found in Me" – Gary Morris, Michael Johnson, Pat Boone (under the title, "Give Her the Thorns, and She'll Find the Roses") (Bob Morrison)
"Love You Baby, to the Bone" – Billy Swan
"Lucky" – Billy Swan

M
"The Man Who Stayed in Monterey" – Roger Miller
"Mary Ann Is a Pistol" – Brother Phelps, Chris Ward
"Meanwhile Back in Abilene" – Roger Miller
"Miss Difficult" – Cowboy Crush
"My Baby's Gone" – The Judds, Sawyer Brown
"Mornin Mornin" – Bobby Goldsboro

N
"Night Is Fallin' in My Heart" – J. P. Pennington, Diamond Rio

O
"Our Love Goes Marching On" – B. J. Thomas

Q
"Queen of My Double Wide Trailer" – Sammy Kershaw

R
"The 'R' Word" – Confederate Railroad
"Reproduction" - Grease 2
"Ridin' High" – The Everly Brothers
"Rock-a-Billy Boy" – Mel McDaniel

S
"The Scene of the Crime" – Jo-El Sonnier
"Send in the Rodeo Clowns" – Sammy Kershaw
"Singin' to the Scarecrow" – Sherrié Austin, Nitty Gritty Dirt Band
"So Shy" – Donny Osmond
"Southbound Train" – Nitty Gritty Dirt Band, Charlie Floyd
"Still Life in Blue" – Sawyer Brown
"Swept Away" – Billy Swan

T
"T.J.'s Last Ride" – Roger Miller
"The Talkin' Song Repair Blues" – Alan Jackson
"Ten Pound Hammer" – 4 Runner, Aaron Tippin, Barbara Mandrell
"The Time Machine" – T. Graham Brown
”The Wonder of You” -Elvis Presley
"Then It's Love" – Don Williams
"Three-Armed Poker Playin' River Rat" – The Everly Brothers
"Tom Green County Fair" – Roger Miller
"Train Long Gone" – Randy Travis

U
"Under Suspicion" – Delbert McClinton, Roy Orbison, Robert Palmer
"Under the Kudzu" – Shenandoah

V
"Vanessa" – Billy Swan, Shakin Stevens

W
"Walkin' a Broken Heart" – Don Williams
"What'll You Do About Me" – Steve Earle, The Forester Sisters, McGuffey Lane, John Schneider, Doug Supernaw, Randy Travis, Nitty Gritty Dirt Band
"When I Miss You" – Robin Lee
"When I Say Forever" – Chris LeDoux
"Where Have All the Average People Gone" – Roger Miller
"Wild Flowers in a Mason Jar (The Farm)" – John Denver
"Wild Love" – Joy Lynn White

X
"X Marks the Spot"

Y
"Your Love Made Me This Way" – The Oak Ridge Boys

Z
 "Zoot Suit Baby"

References

Linde, Dennis